RNA-binding Raly-like protein is a protein that in humans is encoded by the RALYL gene.

References

Further reading